Amblyptilia lithoxesta is a moth of the family Pterophoridae. It is endemic to New Zealand. It was first described by Edward Meyrick in 1885. This species inhabits rough herbage on mountain sides. Larvae feed on Veronica buchananii. Adults are on the wing in January.

Taxonomy
This species was first described by Edward Meyrick in 1885 using specimens collected in January at Arthur's Pass and named Mimaeseoptilis lithoxestus. Meyrick gave a more detailed description later in 1885. In 1928 George Hudson discussing and illustrating this species in his 1928 publication The butterflies and moths of New Zealand using the name Stenoptilia lithoxesta. In 1988 John S. Dugdale discussed this species under this name. In 1993 Cees Gielis placed this species within the genus Amblyptilia, naming it Amblyptilia lithoxestes. This placement was followed in 2010 in the New Zealand Inventory of Biodiversity but naming the species Amblyptilia lithoxesta. This is the name is used in the New Zealand Arthropod Collection. The male lectotype specimen, collected Arthur's Pass, is held at the Natural History Museum, London.

Description 

Meyrick described this species as follows:
Similar in appearance to Platyptilia charadrias but this species is larger in size, much neater in appearance, sharply defined costal streak, black line on lower margin of first segment, and absence of distinct dark line in cilia.

Habitat 
This species inhabits rough herbage on mountain sides.

Behaviour 
The adults of this species are on the wing in January.

Host

The larvae feed on the buds of Veronica buchananii.

Reference

Moths described in 1885
Amblyptilia
Moths of New Zealand
Endemic moths of New Zealand
Taxa named by Edward Meyrick